William MacBrien may refer to:

W. A. H. MacBrien, Canadian hockey executive
William Ross MacBrien (1913–1986), Canadian air marshal

See also
William C. McBrien (1889–1954), Canadian businessman